Labidostomis cyanicornis is a species of short-horned leaf beetles belonging to the family Chrysomelidae, subfamily Cryptocephalinae, tribe Clytrini.

Distribution
This species can be found in the southern part of Europe, Romania, Ukraine, the Volga basin, and in the eastern Palearctic realm.

Description
Pronotum is strongly punctate, with rather short hairs or it is almost hairless, while the abdomen is rather hairy. Antennae are serrated from the 5th article. Labrum is yellowish. The head and pronotum are black with distinct greenish metallic reflex, while the elytra are pale orange-brown. Also legs and underside are greenish-black.

Biology
Adults can be found in May–June feeding on Salix alba, Salix cinerea (Salicaceae) and Populus species. Females lay 10–20 eggs in each spawn and seal them in an eggs case consisting of pure secretion.

References

External links

 Alsphotopage
 Ukrainian Biodiversity Information Network

Clytrini
Beetles of Europe
Beetles described in 1817